Deniz Kadah (born 2 March 1986) is a Turkish professional footballer who plays as a forward for Altay.

Personal life
Kadah was born in Viranşehir in Turkey and grew up in Verden in Germany. He made his debut in the first team for Bundesliga side Hannover 96 on 18 January 2013 against Schalke 04.

References

External links
 
 
 
 

Living people
1986 births
People from Viranşehir
Turkish footballers
German footballers
German people of Turkish descent
Turkish emigrants to Germany
Association football forwards
Rotenburger SV players
TuS Heeslingen players
VfB Lübeck players
Fortuna Düsseldorf players
Hannover 96 players
Hannover 96 II players
Çaykur Rizespor footballers
Antalyaspor footballers
Göztepe S.K. footballers
Altay S.K. footballers
Bundesliga players
2. Bundesliga players
3. Liga players
Süper Lig players